was a Japanese statesman during the Bakumatsu and Meiji period. He was one of the leading figures of the Meiji Restoration, which saw Japan's transition from feudalism to modernity.

Born to a noble family, he was adopted by the influential Iwakura family. By 1858 he was an advisor to Emperor Kōmei, but was exiled from the royal court from 1862 to 1867 for his moderation. After release, he became the liaison between the court and the anti-Tokugawa movement. He played a central role in the new Meiji government after 1868. He successfully opposed aggressive policies in Korea in the crisis of 1873, and was nearly assassinated by his enemies.

He led the 50-member Iwakura Mission for 18 months in Europe and America, studying modern institutions, technology, and diplomacy. The Mission promoted many key reforms that quickly modernized Japan. He promoted a strong imperial system along Western lines, and played a central role in creating financial institutions for the nation. 

The 500 Yen banknote issued by the Bank of Japan carried his portrait.

Early life
Iwakura was born in Kyoto, the second son of low-ranking courtier and nobleman, . Through his mother, he was a first cousin of Emperor Ninkō and descended from the 10th-century Emperor Murakami. His childhood name was Kanemaru but fellow court nobles called him Iwakichi (typically thought of as a commoner's name). Confucian scholar Fusehara Nobuharu taught him Confucianism from childhood and suggested that  adopt Kanemaru as his child. Tomoyasu did this In 1836, giving Kanemaru his own family name. In 1838, the boy changed his name from Kanemaru to Tomomi. In bakumatsu, most of the 137 court nobles had a long tradition. In contrast, the Iwakura house had only become independent from the Koga house in the early Edo period. This newness gave the Iwakura house lower status. It did not have a family business, so they had little money. Iwakura once showed his daring and disregard for the old customs of the nobility by making his home available as a gambling house in order to earn money. In 1839, when he was 14 years old, he had a coming-of-age ceremony and started to get involved in politics. He was trained by the kampaku Takatsukasa Masamichi and wrote the opinion for the imperial Court reformation. In 1854 he became a chamberlain to Emperor Kōmei, his first cousin once removed.

As court noble
As with most other courtiers in Kyoto, Iwakura opposed the Tokugawa shogunate's plans to end Japan's national isolation policy and to open Japan to foreign countries. When Hotta Masayoshi, a Rōjū of the Tokugawa government came to Kyoto to obtain imperial permission to sign the Treaty of Amity and Commerce (United States–Japan) in 1858, Iwakura gathered courtiers who opposed the treaty and attempted to hinder negotiations between the Shōgun and the Court. The imperial court and shogunate had a conflict because of the Treaty of Amity and Commerce. The shogunate agreed to sign the treaty, but almost the people of the imperial court had the opposite idea. However, Kujō Hisatada, an authority of the imperial court, supported the shogunate's idea. Iwakura wanted to prevent the treaty of Amity and Commerce, so he decided to use an unusual method. In particular, he planned to have a direct talk with the Kanpaku by leading a lot of nobles. As a result of this, the Kanpaku agreed to prevent signing the treaty. This incident is called the demo of eighty-eight retainers of the Imperial court, and it made Iwakura famous. Two days later of the incident, Iwakura wrote a political written opinion. It was said that he wanted to postpone signing the treaty because he thought Japan needed to learn about the situation and customs of foreign countries. Also, he emphasized domestic consensus in the written opinion. In 1858, Ii Naosuke became Tairō and signed the Treaty of Amity and Commerce without asking the emperor Kōmei. This angered the emperor, and the relationships between the imperial court and the shogunate became worse. Iwakura made an effort to find a way to settle peacefully.

After Tairō Ii Naosuke was assassinated in 1860, Iwakura supported the Kobugattai Movement, an alliance of the Court and the Shogunate. The central policy of this alliance was the marriage of the Shōgun Tokugawa Iemochi and Princess Kazu-no-Miya Chikako, the younger sister of the Emperor Kōmei. Andō and Kuze became rōjū and began to have power, and they suggested the marriage for the Kōbu gattai, the settlement of the imperial court and the shogunate. Although the shogunate ordered marriage of Kazunomiya and Iemochi, the emperor Kōmei opposed to this request because Kazunomiya and Arisugawanomiya had been already engaged. Also, he could not understand about Kōbu gattai. At that time, the emperor Kōmei demanded an opinion of Iwakura, because he knew that Iwakura was a talented person. Iwakura suggested that the emperor should let the shogunate promise the executing of the treaty withdrawal and allow the marriage of Kazunomiya and Iemochi. The emperor accepted Iwakura's opinion, and the marriage of Kazunomiya and Iemochi was officially decided and the shogunate declared to execute jōi. Samurai and nobles who supported the more radical Sonnō jōi policy saw Iwakura as a supporter of the Shogunate, and put pressure on the Court to expel him. As a result, Iwakura left the Court in 1862 and moved to Iwakura, north of Kyoto. Emperor Kōmei claimed that Iwakura was innocent, but could not stop people who supported radical Sonnō jōi. He decided to hide because he received a threatening message from Takechi Hanpeita from Tosa clans that if Iwakura did not leave the urban area of Kyoto, he would be exposed to Shijōkawara, which meant his death. He started to live in the Reigenji-temple in Nishigamo, where a grave of Iwakura ancestor was. On that day, he wrote about his despair in his diary. After that he found that the Reigenji-temple was not suitable for a long-term stay, so he moved to the Saihōji-temple. Moreover, the imperial court issued the order of expulsion from the city, so he had to move to Iwakura village. Sanshirō, a foster parent of Iwakura's third son, suggested this place.

In exile
The exile continued for around five years. During exile, he had some connections with people who were familiar with politics. In Iwakura he wrote many opinions and sent them to the Court or his political companions in Satsuma Domain. For example, in 1865, Iwakura showed 'Sōrimeichū'(叢裡鳴虫), a written opinion, to Ōkubo Toshimichi and Komatsu Tatewaki from Satsuma clans. He used this title to compare himself to an insect in the grasses. Moreover, he sent 'Zoku：Sōrimeichū'(続・叢裡鳴虫) to Ōkubo and Komatsu. He claimed the importance of national unity for external crises. He relied on Satsuma clans because he found that they were capable people. Also, people from Satsuma clans had connections with the imperial court, so Iwakura tried to get them to send his written opinions to the imperial court. Responses of Nijō Nariyuki, a Kanpaku, and Satsuma clans were subtle. Iwakura was away from politics because of the penalty, so there was a difference between the Iwakura's thoughts and the actual political situation. In 1866 when Shōgun Iemochi died, Iwakura attempted to have the Court seize political initiative. He tried to gather daimyō under the name of the Court but failed. When the Emperor Kōmei died the next year, there was a rumor Iwakura had plotted to murder the emperor with poison, but he escaped arrest. After the Kinmon incident, he returned to normal life, and his innocence was proved.

On October 15th, 1867, the shogunate, Tokugawa Yoshinobu returned his power to the imperial court. Yoshinobu worried about the external crisis and recognized the importance of national unity. In this situation, Ōkubo planned the coup that abolished the shogunate and sekkan systems. On December 8th, Iwakura participated in the kogosho meeting and talked about the disposal of Yoshinobu. During this meeting, Yamauchi Yōdō shouted, claiming that they should let Yoshinobu participate in this meeting and criticized a coup. It is a famous episode that Iwakura scolded Yamauchi because his attitude was rude, but this episode is a fiction. In fact, Iwakura could not easily convince Yamauchi, and their discussion was continued for the long term. Finally, Iwakura and Ōkubo convinced those who opposed the disposal of Yoshinobu.

With Ōkubo Toshimichi and Saigō Takamori, on January 3, 1868, he engineered the seizure of the Kyoto Imperial Palace by forces loyal to Satsuma and Chōshū, thus initiating the Meiji Restoration. He commissioned Imperial banners with the sun and moon on a red field, which helped ensure that the encounters of the Meiji Restoration were generally bloodless affairs.

Meiji bureaucrat

After the establishment of the Meiji government, Iwakura played an important role due to the influence and trust he had with Emperor Meiji. He put forward the emperor's directly ruled government. He was largely responsible for the promulgation of the Five Charter Oath of 1868, and the subject abolition of the han system. Also, he established Dajō-kan. Moreover, he planned to move the emperor from Kyoto to Tokyo to make a new political environment. Some court nobles in Kyoto criticized these reforms, but he promoted these restorations with Sanjō despite their opposition.

Soon after his appointment as Minister of the Right in 1871, he led the two-year around-the-world journey known as the Iwakura mission, visiting the United States and several countries in Europe with the purpose of renegotiating the unequal treaties and gathering information to help effect the modernization of Japan. American newspapers reported that a visit by Iwakura was as important as a visit by the Prime Minister of the United Kingdom. He failed when he discussed the revision of the unequal treaty with the U.S. president. The U.S. president pointed out that Iwakura did not have a commission of full powers. Ōkubo and Itō immediately returned to Japan on March 24 to get a commission of full powers and then returned to the United States on June 17. Despite their efforts, the United States was no longer interested in the revision of the unequal treaty at that time. In his observations, Iwakura was surprised at the economic prosperity in western countries. He was especially interested in the railways. Also, he learned the importance of religious problems in the United States and he thought that the prohibition of Christianity was an obstacle to change the unequal treaties. Besides, he felt the danger of rapid Westernization, because he saw and learned about the merits and demerits of Westernization. At first, this trip was planned for 10 months and a half, but it took a year and 10 months in the end. A celebration was held in Manchester and Liverpool in 1997 to celebrate the 125th anniversary of the Iwakura Mission.

Before the return of the Iwakura mission, the dispatch of Saigō to Korea was decided in a cabinet meeting. Generally, people thought that the dispatch of Saigō was too dangerous, but Saigō persisted in his decision. On his return to Japan in 1873, he was just in time to prevent an invasion of Korea (Seikanron). Iwakura opposed the dispatch because he thought that Japan needed to see not only the Korean problem but also other foreign issues such as Karafuto and Taiwan. Also, Iwakura wanted to prevent the dispatch of Saigō to avoid foreign wars. Realizing that Japan was not in any position to challenge the western powers in its present state, he advocated strengthening the imperial institution, which he felt could be accomplished through a written constitution and a limited form of parliamentary democracy. Ōkubo supported Iwakura's idea. In the next meeting, Saigō was absent to imply his disposal in case his claim would not be accepted. Sanjō Sanetomi, a prime minister was surprised about it and suddenly changed his opinion from the opposition of dispatch to the acceptance of dispatch. A lot of members including Iwakura criticized the sudden mind change of Sanjō, and they requested their disposal. Sanjō panicked and he became unable to work because he wanted to avoid every member's disposal. Instead of Sanjō, Iwakura became the substitute of the prime minister and prevented the dispatch of Saigō. Due to this decision, some people had complaints, and Iwakura was attacked by nine people led by Takechi Kumakichi in Kuichigaizaka, Akasaka. He was slightly injured but severely damaged mentally. (Kuichigai Incident)

In 1873, Kido and Ōkubo raised written opinions about a constitution. Both opinions said that Japan should make a constitution as soon as possible, so to establishing a constitution became an urgent issue in Japan. In this situation, Ōkubo was assassinated in 1878, and Iwakura had to choose Itō Hirobumi or Ōkuma Shigenobu as a successor of Ōkubo. Itō wanted absolute monarchy in Germany, and Ōkuma suggested a parliamentary cabinet system in the United Kingdom. Ultimately, Iwakura chose Itō and Germany system as the constitution of Japan.

He ordered Inoue Kowashi to begin work on a constitution in 1881, and ordered Itō Hirobumi to Europe to study various European systems. In March 1882, Itō departed for Europe. Iwakura had high expectations for the investigation of Itō. On the other hand, during the dispatch of Itō, Iwakura worried that Itō might be really influenced by Germany. Although Iwakura accepted to make a constitution based on the Germany system, he wanted to make a constitution unique to Japan. Also, Iwakura wanted to cherish the Japanese tradition and emperor system. From such an idea, in 1882, He established an Internal regulation interrogation station to investigate imperial ceremonies and Japanese tradition, and offered the install of the National history compilation stations in 1883. This station aimed to translate Japanese history into English.

Death
Although in poor health by early 1883, Iwakura went to Kyoto in May to direct efforts to restore and preserve the imperial palace and the buildings of the old city, many of which had been falling into disrepair since the transfer of the capital to Tokyo. Soon however, he became seriously ill and was confined to his bed. The Meiji Emperor sent his personal physician, Erwin Bälz, to examine Iwakura; Baelz diagnosed advanced throat cancer. The emperor personally visited his cousin and old friend on July 19, and was moved to tears at his condition. Iwakura died the following day, and was given a state funeral, the first ever given by the imperial government. Just before dying, Iwakura invited Inoue Kaoru over. Bälz and Inoue were with Iwakura until the end of his life. He was buried in Asamadai, Minami-Shinagawa.

Personal life 
Iwakura Tomomi's height was about 160 cm. He was born in poverty, and he lived a simple life. He used to like Japanese sake and drank around 90 ml, three times a day. However, because of his health condition and food restrictions, he could drink western wine only instead of Japanese sake. During his life after retirement, he did not exercise at all, and ate very little to the extent he was compared to a bird. Iwakura was very particular about what to eat, and was fond of eating fish, meat, and vegetables, rather than beef and chicken. He also liked the cuisine of Kyoto, and turtle cuisine was one of his favorites. His hobby was Noh dance in plain clothes. He was an open-minded person who put himself in the other person's shoes before forming any opinion. He had a wife, named Mineko, but she died on October 24, 1874. After Mineko's death, he remarried Makiko Noguchi.

Tributes 

Katsu Kaishū

"Iwakura was open-minded, and he was unique in court nobles."

Tokutomi Sohō

"Iwakura was an outstanding person. His appearance from bakumatsu to the early Meiji period was lucky for the Imperial Household, the state, and citizens."

"Iwakura was a brave man not only in court nobles but also in politicians."

Itō Hirobumi

"Iwakura was like a shelf."

(It means that when Itō faced the difficult problem, he could consult Iwakura.)

Honours

From the corresponding article in the Japanese Wikipedia

Grand Cordon of the Order of the Rising Sun (29 December 1876)
Grand Cordon of the Order of the Chrysanthemum (1 November 1882)

Order of precedence
Junior fifth rank (28th day, 10th month of the ninth year of Tenpo (1838))
Fifth rank (Fourth day, sixth month of the 12th year of Tenpo (1841))
Senior fifth rank (18th day, second month of the second year of Koka (1845))
Fourth rank (10th day, sixth month of the seventh year of Ansei (1854))
Senior fourth rank (Fifth day, first month of the second year of Man'en (1861))
Third rank (Second day, second month of the fourth year of Keio (1868))
Senior second rank (25th day, first month of the second year of Meiji (1869))
First rank (18 May 1876)
Senior first rank (20 July 1885; posthumous)

Ancestry

Notes

References 
 Beasley, William G. (1972). The Meiji Restoration. Stanford: Stanford University Press.  ; OCLC 579232
 Hane, Mikiso. Modern Japan: A Historical Survey. Westview Press (2001). 
 Jansen, Marius B. and Gilbert Rozman, eds. (1986). Japan in Transition: from Tokugawa to Meiji. Princeton: Princeton University Press. ; OCLC 12311985
 Nish, Ian. (1998) The Iwakura Mission to America and Europe: A New Assessment. Richmond, Surrey: Japan Library. 	; ; OCLC 40410662
 Nussbaum, Louis-Frédéric and Käthe Roth. (2005).  Japan encyclopedia. Cambridge: Harvard University Press. ; OCLC 58053128
 Sims, Richard L. (2001). Japanese Political History Since the Meiji Renovation 1868–2000. New York: Palgrave Macmillan. ; ;

External links

National Diet bio & portrait
Meiji Dignitaries is a portrait of Tomomi and others from 1877

1825 births
1883 deaths
People from Kyoto
Japanese politicians
Nobles of the Meiji Restoration
Kazoku
Members of the Iwakura Mission